Didrik Solli-Tangen (born 11 June 1987) is a Norwegian singer who represented Norway in the Eurovision Song Contest 2010  with the song "My Heart Is Yours".

Biography
Solli-Tangen was born in Porsgrunn. From his early years he was interested in music, and at 15 years old he joined a band, first as the drummer, and later as lead singer, performing in front of classmates and family, and joined the local “high school musical”. By the time he reached upper-secondary school his father had him receive voice coaching from Anders Vangen. Though at the beginning he refused to try singing in an operatic style, considering it old fashioned, he began slowly to accept the idea.

Didrik graduated from the Barratt Due Institute of performing arts in Oslo in 2010, with the highest grade. He's called "the opera singer" by several Norwegian media, but he claims not to accept that label.

Eurovision 2010
In 2009, Stockholm-based songwriter Hanne Sørvaag and composer Fredrik Kempe wrote for him My Heart Is Yours, for the 2010 national Eurovision selection. On 6 February Didrik won the national final at Oslo Spektrum, earning the right to represent Norway in Eurovision 2010.

Being the host country representative, he qualified directly to the final, in which he performed in third position. At the end of the voting, he placed 20 out of 25 contestants.

On 3 September 2010 Solli-Tangens second single "Best Kept Secret" was released under the record label Universal Records. The release of his debut-album, called "Guilty Pleasures", was on 1 November 2010.

Melodi Grand Prix 2020
In 2013, Fredrik Boström, Mats Tärnfors, Niclas Lundin and him wrote the song Out of Air. He and his brother Emil Solli-Tangen were chosen by NRK to participate in the Melodi Grand Prix 2020, the Norwegian national selection for Eurovision 2020. They were already prequalified for the final, but they performed the song for the first time in the second semifinal, on January 18, in Fornebu. In the Grand Final, they performed second, after Raylee and before Magnus Bokn. They didn't qualify for the Gold Final, being eliminated by the juries.

Maskorama

In 2021, Didrik won Maskorama (Masked Singer Norway) as Snømonsteret (Snow Monster).

Other Activities
In 2014, he co-hosted Skal vi danse replacing Carsten Skjelbreid, but he had to miss the 6th week due to his emergency surgery for appendicitis. His place was taken on short notice by Guri Solberg.

Discography

Albums

Singles

References

External links

 Official site

1987 births
Eurovision Song Contest entrants of 2010
Living people
Melodi Grand Prix contestants
Melodi Grand Prix winners
Masked Singer winners
Eurovision Song Contest entrants for Norway
21st-century Norwegian male opera singers
Musicians from Porsgrunn
English-language singers from Norway
Barratt Due Institute of Music alumni